Zorana Mihajlović (born 5 May 1970) is a Serbian politician who served as deputy prime minister of serbia from 2014 to 2022 and as minister of mining and energy from 2012 to 2014, and again from 2020 to 2022. A member of the Serbian Progressive Party (SNS), she previously served as minister of construction, transport and infrastructure from 2014 to 2020.

Early life and education
Mihajlović was born in May 1970 in Tuzla, Bosnia and Herzegovina, but she finished her elementary and secondary school in Belgrade, Serbia. She graduated from the University of Belgrade Faculty of Economics in 1993 with a degree in Foreign and Domestic Trade. Her thesis was titled Energy Resources in European Economic Community.

She received her M.A. degree in 1998 at Faculty of Economics with the thesis Energy Sector of Serbia and Selected European Countries - France, Germany and Sweden.

Mihajlović obtained a Ph.D. degree in 2001 from the Faculty of Economics with the thesis Energy and Economic Development and  - Analyses of Interdependence between Serbia and Countries of European Union. In 2006, she became research associate at Faculty of Economics, and since 2008 she has been an associate professor at Megatrend University.

She has published three books in Serbian and several scientific papers in a national journal (also in Serbian).

Professional career
Mihajlović worked for nearly 15 years in her profession,  first as a Professor of Accounting and Business Economy at First High School in Economics in Belgrade. From 1996 to 2006, she worked at the Electric Power Industry of Serbia (EPS), in the Elektroistok public company for electric power transport. She was a member of the EPS’s Board of Management from 2004 to 2007. Since 2008, she has worked as an associate professor at Megatrend University in Belgrade.

Political career
Mihajlović started her political career as a member of G17 Plus party. During that time she worked as adviser for Energy and Environmental Protection to Miroljub Labus, deputy prime minister in the Government of Serbia. She was head of the Sector for Energy and Environmental Protection Politics, and from 2005 to 2006 she was also head of the Cabinet.

Mihajlović joined the Serbian Progressive Party in April 2010. She soon became a member of the Executive Board of the Serbian Progressive Party. During the 2012 campaign for Serbian general elections, Zorana Mihajlović was a leader in the campaign for her Serbian Progressive Party.

On 27 July 2012, Mihajlović was elected Minister of Energy, Development and Environmental Protection in the Government of Serbia.

In February 2017, the Prime Minister of Serbia Aleksandar Vučić decided to run for the 2017 Serbian presidential elections. He won the elections in the first round and was sworn as the President of Serbia on 31 May 2017. Weeks later, he gave mandate to Ana Brnabić to form the governmental cabinet. On 29 June 2017, the cabinet of Ana Brnabić was formed, with Mihajlović keeping her office.

Personal life
Mihajlović is fluent in English. She has one son.

Notes

References

External links 

Official Biography of Minister of Energy, Development and Environmental Protection

|-

|-

1970 births
Living people
Politicians from Tuzla
Serbs of Bosnia and Herzegovina
Deputy Prime Ministers of Serbia
University of Belgrade Faculty of Economics alumni
Government ministers of Serbia
Serbian Progressive Party politicians
Women government ministers of Serbia
Construction ministers of Serbia
21st-century Serbian women politicians
21st-century Serbian politicians